A sequence point defines any point in a computer program's execution at which it is guaranteed that all side effects of previous evaluations will have been performed, and no side effects from subsequent evaluations have yet been performed. They are often mentioned in reference to C and C++, because they are a core concept for determining the validity and, if valid, the possible results of expressions. Adding more sequence points is sometimes necessary to make an expression defined and to ensure a single valid order of evaluation.

With C++11, usage of the term sequence point has been replaced by sequencing. There are three possibilities:

An expression's evaluation can be sequenced before that of another expression, or equivalently the other expression's evaluation is sequenced after that of the first.
The expressions' evaluation is indeterminately sequenced, meaning one is sequenced before the other, but which is unspecified.
The expressions' evaluation is unsequenced.

The execution of unsequenced evaluations can overlap, with catastrophic undefined behavior if they share state. This situation can arise in parallel computations, causing race conditions. However, it can already arise in simple non-concurrent situations like (a = 1) + (b = a), where part of the assignment to a (e.g., half of the bits) may happen before b = a, and the rest afterwards, such that after evaluation of the expression, b may contain a meaningless intermediate state of a.

Examples of ambiguity
Consider two functions f() and g(). In C and C++, the + operator is not associated with a sequence point, and therefore in the expression f()+g() it is possible that either f() or g() will be executed first. The comma operator introduces a sequence point, and therefore in the code f(),g() the order of evaluation is defined: first f() is called, and then g() is called.

Sequence points also come into play when the same variable is modified more than once within a single expression. An often-cited example is the C expression i=i++, which apparently both assigns i its previous value and increments i. The final value of i is ambiguous, because, depending on the order of expression evaluation, the increment may occur before, after, or interleaved with the assignment. The definition of a particular language might specify one of the possible behaviors or simply say the behavior is undefined. In C and C++, evaluating such an expression yields undefined behavior. Other languages, such as C#, define the precedence of the assignment and increment operator in such a way that the result of the expression i=i++ is guaranteed.

Sequence points in C and C++

In C and C++, sequence points occur in the following places. (In C++, overloaded operators act like functions, and thus operators that have been overloaded introduce sequence points in the same way as function calls.)

Between evaluation of the left and right operands of the && (logical AND), || (logical OR) (as part of short-circuit evaluation), and comma operators. For example, in the expression , all side effects of the sub-expression  are completed before any attempt to access .
Between the evaluation of the first operand of the ternary conditional operator and its second or third operand. For example, in the expression  there is a sequence point after the first , meaning it has already been incremented by the time the second instance is executed.
At the end of a full expression.
Before a function is entered in a function call. The order in which the arguments are evaluated is not specified, but this sequence point means that all of their side effects are complete before the function is entered.
At a function return, after the return value is copied into the calling context. (This sequence point is only specified in the C++ standard; it is present only implicitly in C.)
(This is not an example of the comma operator.)
After each conversion associated with an input/output format specifier.

References

External links
Question 3.8 of the FAQ for comp.lang.c

C (programming language)
C++
Programming paradigms